Lydia Sargent (January 10, 1942 – September 27, 2020) was an American feminist, writer, author, playwright, and actor.

Biography
She was a founder and original member of the South End Press Collective, as well as Z Magazine, which she co-edited and co-produced. She  organized the Z Communications Institute every year and taught classes there. She was also a member of the interim consultative committee of the International Organization for a Participatory Society.

Her plays include "I Read About My Death In Vogue Magazine" and "Playbook" with Maxine Klein and Howard Zinn. She edited Women and Revolution: The Unhappy Marriage of Marxism and Feminism, which features a lead essay by Heidi Hartmann. Sargent wrote the long-running "Hotel Satire" column for Z Magazine, "where gals come to learn their true purpose on this earth, i.e., to service men".

References

External links
 Lydia Sargent's Znet homepage
 Searching for a Post-Sexist Society by Lydia Sargent
 Lydia Sargent, Live Like Her by Michael Albert

1942 births
2020 deaths
American feminist writers
American socialist feminists